Jake Auerbach (born 1958) is a British film maker specialising in documentary subjects. Though his films have ranged across the cultural spectrum he is best known for his portraits of artists both contemporary and historical.

Career

Jake Auerbach was born in Sheffield, Yorkshire to Frank Auerbach and Julia Wolstenholme. He was educated at King Alfred School in North London (1963–76) and then joined the Economist newspaper, in the distribution department. After two years he left to join the Henson Organisation, working on The Muppet Show and Dark Crystal.

Auerbach then worked on the TV film 'Haunted', in the USA before returning to the UK and the editing department of the BBC. After a year in the cutting rooms working on strands such as Arena, Omnibus and Horizon he began to direct items on the arts magazine programme Review. There followed films on rock music, photography, Voodoo, football and major documentaries about London, the art market and filmed portraits of artists. In 1992 he left the BBC to become an independent Producer/Director. Auerbach now runs his own company, Jake Auerbach Films Ltd.

The Metropolitan Museum of Art, The Tate Gallery, The Royal Academy and the National Gallery have presented Auerbach’s films and seasons of his work have been shown at Abbot Hall, Kendal (Cumbria), Pallant House, Chichester (West Sussex) and most notably The National Portrait Gallery in London.

"I tell people that I don't make art films, I make people films... portraits rather than profiles" says Auerbach. "It's really satisfying then to have these films screened at the National Portrait Gallery, it feels right."

Films

20 Sites n Years (44)				Prod/Director		Jake Auerbach Films 2016
Each spring artist Tom Phillips walks a nine-mile circle taking photographs in 20 specific places. These photographs are taken from the same spot in the same direction with the same framing. The project was begun in 1973 and the photographs when seen together reveal the quirky and sometimes inexplicable effect of human beings on their surroundings. The result is an eternal, evolving portrait of Phillips’ neighbourhood in South London.

FRANK (56)				Prod/Director		Jake Auerbach Films 2015
Frank Auerbach rarely leaves his small corner of North London. When an exhibition of his work opened in the Kunstmuseum Bonn before travelling to Tate Britain, film maker Jake Auerbach decided to go and film the show so that his father could see how it looked… they set up a projector and filmed his responses to seeing the work after a break of anything up to 60 years. The result is a film that unfolds an obsessive painter’s personal manifesto (citing references as diverse as Morecambe & Wise, Gauguin and Shakespeare) which is woven into the relationship between father and son.

The Last Art Film (95)				Prod/Director		JAFilms 2012
Contemporary artists Michael Landy, Tracey Emin, Gary Hume, Grayson Perry, Celia Paul, Jake Tilson, Michael Craig-Martin, Allen Jones, Tom Phillips, Paula Rego, Frank Auerbach, Joe Tilson and scores more from the last 2000 years voiced by Jim Broadbent, Ian Holm, Lizzy McInnerny and Tim McInnerny discuss the real business of making art.

Paula Rego: telling tales (50)				Prod/Director		JAFilms 2009
An intimate portrait of the artist Paula Rego.

Allen Jones: Women and Men (59)			Prod/Director		JAFilms 2007
A portrait of the artist Allen Jones

Rodin: the sculptors' view (53)				Prod/Director		JAFilms 2006
Rodin as seen through the eyes of contemporary sculptors Rachel Whiteread, Sir Anthony Caro, Barry Flanagan, Marc Quinn, Tony Cragg, Richard Deacon and Antony Gormley

John Virtue’s London (50)		Prod/Director		JAFilms 2005
A film about the painter John Virtue

Lucian Freud: Portraits (68)		Prod/Director		JAFilms/BBC 2004
Lucian Freud as seen through the eyes of those who model for him including David Hockney, the Dowager Duchess of Devonshire and Andrew Parker Bowles

Restoration (14 short films)		Prod/Director		Endemol/BBC 2003
A series of short films made with Jonathan Foyle

Titian (50) 				Prod/Director		National Gallery 2003
with John Berger

Frank Auerbach... to the studio (53)			Producer		HRJAFilms/BBC 2002

A Portrait of Majesty (20)		Prod/Director		BBC 2001

Orange Juice (short drama)		Producer		Various 2000/1

Private View Project			Chairman		L Ashley Found. ‘96-9

Patrick Hughes (20)			Director		Various 1996
A portrait of Britain's leading surrealist artist Patrick Hughes

Kitaj; In the Picture (50)		Director		HRJAFilms/BBC 1995
A unique interview with the artist R. B. Kitaj.

Sickert’s London (50)			Director		HRJAFilms/BBC 1994
A film about the forgotten hero of British art Walter Sickert. Voiced by Alan Bennett and with music by Jools Holland.

Missing Pictures series (20s)		Director		HRJAFilms/BBC 1993

The Nation (60)				Prod/Director		BBC 1991/2

Nevin: Picture Hunt (40)		Director		BBC 1991
With footballer Pat Nevin

Phillips: Artists Eye (40)		Prod/Director		BBC 1990
A portrait of artist Tom Phillips

Rego: Artists Eye (40)			Prod/Director		BBC 1990
A portrait of Paula Rego.

Sickert in Liverpool (20)		Director		BBC 1989

Bandes Designee (15)			Director		BBC 1989

Cindy Palmano (20)			Director		BBC 1989

Lucian Freud (50)			Prod/Director		BBC 1988
A unique interview with the painter Lucian Freud.

Jeffrey Bernard (20)			Director		BBC 1988
Jeffrey Bernard reviews the Ideal Home Exhibition.

Freud (20)				Prod/Director		BBC 1988

Frank Zappa (20)			Director		BBC 1988
An interview with Frank Zappa

History Painting (20 minutes)		Director		BBC 1987

References

Sources
http://www.imdb.com/name/nm1589649/ Internet Movie Database page
https://web.archive.org/web/20110717001837/http://www.moviemail-online.co.uk/directors/3023/Jake-Auerbach/ MovieMail page
http://shootingpeople.org/cards/Jake Shooting People page
The Independent Independent review of Paula Rego: telling tales
https://www.amazon.co.uk/s/?url=search-alias%3Ddvd&field-keywords=jake+auerbach&Go.x=13&Go.y=10&Go=Go Amazon page
http://www.npg.org.uk/about/press/jake-auerbach.php?searched=jake+auerbach&highlight=searchHighlight+searchHighlight1+searchHighlight2 National Portrait Gallery Season page
https://web.archive.org/web/20100207033753/http://www.canadianart.ca/microsites/film/2006/ Canadian Art Film Series 2006
https://web.archive.org/web/20100919002907/http://www.thisislondon.co.uk/lifestyle/article-23728979-inside-paula-regos-madhouse.do Evening Standard review of Paula Rego: telling tales
http://www.royalacademy.org.uk/ra-magazine/autumn2006/autumn2006features/life-force,21,RAMA.html Royal Academy of Arts Rodin: the sculptors’ view page
http://www.tomphillips.co.uk/works/portraits/item/5440-brian-eno Tom Phillips page
http://www.artfifa.com/fr/index.php?option=com_film&task=view&id=689&year=25&Itemid=289&lang=en 25th International Festival of Films on Art Montreal - Rodin page
https://web.archive.org/web/20110707164521/http://artfifa.com/index.php?option=com_film&task=view&id=2142&Itemid=482 28th International Festival of Films on Art Montreal - Paula Rego: telling tales page
https://web.archive.org/web/20110707165408/http://www.artfifa.com/index.php?option=com_film&task=view&id=114&year=23&Itemid=402 23rd International Festival of Films on Art Montreal - Lucian Freud: Portraits page
http://www.spectator.co.uk/search/search.thtml?search=jake+auerbach Spectator Magazine book reviews by Jake Auerbach
The Independent Auerbach’s Picasso article
https://www.theguardian.com/media/2004/jun/10/tvandradio.television1 Guardian Freud review

External links
 
 Jake Auerbach Films

1958 births
Living people
Film people from Sheffield
English people of German descent
English people of German-Jewish descent
British documentary filmmakers
Jake Auerbach